KEZZ (94.1 FM) is a radio station broadcasting an adult contemporary format. Licensed to Phippsburg, Colorado, the station serves the Steamboat Springs, Colorado area, and is owned by Don Tlapek, through licensee Blizzard Broadcasting II Colorado, LLC.

References

External links

Mainstream adult contemporary radio stations in the United States
EZZ